Mount Willey is a mountain located in Grafton County, New Hampshire.  The mountain is named after Samuel Willey, Jr. (1766–1826) and his family, who in 1825 moved into a house in Crawford Notch. The family was killed a year later in August 1826 during a landslide.

Mount Willey is part of the Willey Range of the White Mountains, of which it is the southernmost and second highest.  It, along with Mount Field, forms the western wall of Crawford Notch. The summit is just outside the Crawford Notch State Park; it is at the northeast corner of the Pemigewasset Wilderness.

The north and east faces of Mount Willey drain directly into the Saco River, thence into the Gulf of Maine at Saco, Maine. The south and west sides drain into the North Fork of the Pemigewasset River, thence into the East Branch, the Pemigewasset River, Merrimack River, and into the Gulf of Maine at Newburyport, Massachusetts.

See also

 List of mountains in New Hampshire
 White Mountain National Forest

References

External links
 
  PeakBagger.com: Mt. Willey
  Mt. Willey
 AMC: Hiking Mt. Willey
  hikethewhites.com: Mt. Willey
 NH State Parks: Willey House
  Mt. Willey - FranklinSites.com Hiking Guide

Mountains of New Hampshire
Mountains of Grafton County, New Hampshire
New England Four-thousand footers